White Mountain Lake is an unincorporated community and census-designated place in Navajo County, Arizona, United States. White Mountain Lake has a post office with ZIP code 85912.

Demographics
As of the census of 2010, there were 2,205 people, 922 households, and 590 families living in the CDP.

References

Unincorporated communities in Navajo County, Arizona
Unincorporated communities in Arizona